The Battle of the Lerna Mills was fought on June 24, 1825, in Lerna, Greece between the Egyptian forces of Ibrahim Pasha and Greek forces led by General Yannis Makriyannis, Demetrios Ypsilantis, Andreas Metaxas and Konstantinos Mavromichalis. It was the first Greek success against Ibrahim and saved the city of Nafplion, seat of the government, from capture.

Before the conflict
After the Greek army (led by Theodoros Kolokotronis) fled to Karitena, Ibrahim's forces captured Tripolitsa, which was completely abandoned. Immediately afterwards, Ibrahim led an army of 5,000 soldiers to the plains of Argos to seize Nafplion. When Ibrahim's forces reached the Mills of Lerna on June 25, General Makrygiannis and Minister of War Metaxas organized a resistance force containing 350 Greek soldiers. General Demetrios Ypsilantis, Konstantinos Mavromichalis, Panagiotis Rodios and several philhellenes (such as François Graillard and Heinrich Treiber) volunteered in the defense of the garrison.

The position was weak and they were very few compared to Ibrahim's army. Thus many were eager to leave using their horses or by fish boats but Makriyannis made sure all horses and fish boats were gone in secret. This made everybody more resolute in defending the position and they started digging trenches. Admiral De Rigny watched from aboard the helplessness of the Greeks and advised Makriyannis against defending the position but Makriyannis ignored him by saying: 

"They are many indeed but we few have decided to die and have God on our side... And when the few decide to die, most times win... And if we die today we will die for our country and our religion and this death is a good one". "Tres bien" replied De Rigny.

Battle
The battle began at June 25, 1825. Protecting Lerna was vital since the mills contained large quantities of grain that supplied food to Nafplion. The mills of Lerna were surrounded by a stone wall that was flanked by a deep pond and a marsh. Moreover, the garrison was supported by two gunboats that were anchored a short distance (or "musket-shot distance") from the shore. Unfortunately, the Greeks did not repair a small break in the stone wall. As a result, a small contingent of Arabs exploited this weakness in the defensive structure and attempted to create an entrance by increasing the size of the break. When the Arabs forced themselves through the break, they were prevented from regrouping once they entered the courtyard. Thirteen Arabs were killed by a charge of Greeks and philhellenes led by Makrygiannis. Ultimately, the remaining Arabs in the overall contingent were forced to flee. The Greeks, afterwards, attempted to fill in the gap in the stone wall. At the same time, 50 warriors under the command of Mitros Liakopoulos arrived at the battle to help the defenders. Despite the constant reinforcements he received, Ibrahim was aware of the fact that the Greeks were prepared to staunchly defend the Lerna Mills and he eventually retreated to the plains of Argos. From there, Ibrahim took his army to Tripolitsa on June 29, 1825. The Egyptian casualties, according to General Makriyannis, reached 500 dead men.

As long as the Egyptian forces were repelled successfully, some French naval officers came ashore and congratulated Makriyannis. He was indeed that day the heart of the defenders in Myloi and he was eager to help wherever there was need. Thus he was shot in the right hand from musket fire but kept it secret until the end of the battle. He claims he was recognized by some of Ibrahim's shooters that remembered him from Neokastro. He was taken to the French frigate of Admiral De Rigny to be treated afterwards.

See also
List of battles

References

Sources
Finlay, George. History of the Greek Revolution. Blackwood and Sons, 1861 (Harvard University).
Phillips, Walter Alison. The War of Greek Independence, 1821 to 1833. Smith, Elder and Company, 1897 (University of Michigan).
 Makriyannis, Memoirs, IX Archived October 2, 2009, at the Wayback Machine.
 Paparigopoulos, K, History of the Greek Nation (Greek edition), vol. 6, p. 164-165

Further reading
 General Makriyannis, Ἀπομνημονεύματα (Memoirs), Athens: 1907 (preface by Yannis Vlahogiannis; in Greek).

Lerna
Lerna
Lerna Mills
Lerna
the Lerna Mills
1825 in Greece
History of Argolis
June 1825 events
Peloponnese in the Greek War of Independence